Spiral is a 2007 American psychological thriller produced by Coattails Entertainment and Ariescope Pictures. The film stars Joel David Moore, Amber Tamblyn, Zachary Levi, and Tricia Helfer.  Spiral was co-directed by Moore and Adam Green.  The original screenplay for the film was written by Moore and Jeremy Danial Boreing.

Spiral was an Official Selection and was awarded the "Gold Vision" Award at the 22nd Annual Santa Barbara International Film Festival in 2007. The "Gold Vision" Award is given for the "most innovative and unique film with an inspiring and groundbreaking vision."

Plot
The story follows lonely introvert Mason, a telesales insurance company worker by day and talented painter as well as a lover of classic jazz by night. His only friend is his boss, Berkeley (Levi), who keeps an eye on him and humors his bizarre behavior. When awkward Mason meets  social Amber, a new co-worker, he begins to come out of himself, and reveals the depth and darkness of his mind.

Cast
 Joel David Moore as Mason
 Amber Tamblyn as Amber
 Zachary Levi as Berkeley
 Tricia Helfer as Sasha
 David Muller as Will
 Annie Neal as Diana

Production
Spiral was filmed in Portland, Oregon.

Soundtrack
Because jazz is such an important part of the plot, Joel David Moore wanted to use a completely original score. It was composed by Todd Caldwell and Michael Herring. It features Brad Leali on alto sax, Jay DaVersa on trumpet, Royce Chambers playing tenor and soprano sax, Todd's father Don Caldwell on tenor sax, and Ted Greenberg on drums.

Reception

Box office
The film grossed $3,072 in the United States.

Critical
The film received mixed reviews from critics. As of February 17, 2008, the review aggregator Rotten Tomatoes reported that 60% of critics gave the film positive reviews, based on 5 reviews. Metacritic reported the film had a weighted average score of 40 out of 100, based on 4 reviews.

References

External links
 
 
 
 
 

2000s thriller films
2007 films
American thriller films
2000s English-language films
Films directed by Adam Green
Films set in Oregon
Films shot in Portland, Oregon
2000s American films